Ernst II (31 August 1871 in Altenburg – 22 March 1955 in Trockenborn-Wolfersdorf) was the last reigning duke of Saxe-Altenburg and a German general active during World War I.

Early life
He was the fourth child and only son of Prince Moritz, the youngest son of Georg, Duke of Saxe-Altenburg and Princess Augusta of Saxe-Meiningen.

The death of his father, on the 13 May 1907, made him first in the line of succession to the duchy of Saxe-Altenburg. He inherited the dukedom when his uncle and namesake, Ernst I, died without any surviving male issue.

First marriage
In 1898 in Bückeburg, Ernst married his first wife, Princess Adelaide of Schaumburg-Lippe, a granddaughter of George William, Prince of Schaumburg-Lippe. They had four children:
 Princess Charlotte (Potsdam, 4 March 1899 – Hemmelmark bei Eckernförde, 16 February 1989); married on 11 July 1919 Prince Sigismund of Prussia and had issue.
 Georg Moritz, Hereditary Prince of Saxe-Altenburg (Potsdam, 13 May 1900 – Rendsburg, 13 February 1991), never married, no issue.
 Princess Elisabeth Karola (Potsdam, 6 April 1903 – Breiholz, 30 January 1991).
 Prince Frederick Ernst  (Potsdam, 15 May 1905 – Rosenheim, 23 February 1985), never married, no issue.

World War I
During World War I, Ernst refused all honorary appointments at the Kaiser's headquarters, which would have been considerably safer than other areas. Resigning from his courtesy rank of Generalleutnant, he requested and was granted the colonelcy and the command of his duchy's regiment, the 153rd (8th Thuringian) Infantry. His regiment participated in the Battle of Mons. He replaced Paul von Reichenau as commander of the 15th Infantry Brigade when Reichenau was killed in action in 1914. Quickly promoted to General der Infanterie, he led several brigades on the western front. In 1915, he was awarded the Pour le Mérite award and was given command of the 8th Infantry Division, further distinguishing himself in the Battle of the Somme. In late 1916, he relinquished his field command because of illness and returned to Altenburg for the remainder of the war.

A great lover of science, Ernst had a wireless installation fitted inside his castle in Altenburg at the start of the war, especially to communicate with airships. Ernst also had a lifelong interest in wireless telegraphy and telephony, and he was considered an expert of aeronautics.

When Germany lost the war, all German princes lost their titles and states. Ernst was one of the first princes to realize that major changes were coming and quickly arrived at an amicable settlement with his subjects. He was forced to abdicate the government of the duchy on 13 November 1918 and spent the rest of his life as a private citizen.

Later life
After his abdication Ernst, with a moderate fortune, retired to a hotel in Berlin. Two years later, in 1920, his marriage ended in divorce. Later that year, Ernst announced his engagement to Helena Thomas, an opera singer. They had met while she was temporarily filling an engagement at the Ducal Theatre in Altenburg during the war. The marriage never took place, however.

 
On 15 July 1934 Ernst married his second wife, Maria Triebel, who had been his companion for many years, at his home, Schloss Fröhliche Wiederkunft ("Palace of Happy Returning") at Wolfersdorf. This hunting lodge received its name when its first owner, John Frederick I, Elector of Saxony, returned there in 1552 to meet his family after five years of absence as a war prisoner. It was a morganatic marriage, and she received only the title of "Baroness Reiseneck". They had no children.

Still interested in science, Ernst established a modern observatory in Wolfersdorf, employing Kurd Kisshauer in 1922. On 1 May 1937, Ernst joined the Nazi Party

Ernst became the only former reigning German prince who accepted German Democratic Republic citizenship after World War II, refusing an offer to leave his beloved "Palace of Happy Returning" and relocate to the British occupation zone. The Schloß had been confiscated by the Soviet occupiers, but Ernst had been granted free use of it until his death. In March 1954, with the death of Charles Edward, Duke of Saxe-Coburg and Gotha, he became the last survivor of the German princes who had reigned until 1918. One year later, he died at the Schloß.

Honours
He received the following orders and decorations:

Ancestry

References

|-

1871 births
1955 deaths
House of Saxe-Altenburg
Princes of Saxe-Altenburg
Dukes of Saxe-Altenburg
Monarchs who abdicated
Generals of Infantry (Prussia)
Recipients of the Pour le Mérite (military class)
Military personnel from Thuringia
People from Altenburg